John Oravainen (born 17 December 1943) is an Australian former swimmer. He competed in two events at the 1964 Summer Olympics.

References

External links
 

1943 births
Living people
Australian male breaststroke swimmers
Australian male medley swimmers
Olympic swimmers of Australia
Swimmers at the 1964 Summer Olympics
Commonwealth Games medallists in swimming
Commonwealth Games silver medallists for Australia
Swimmers at the 1962 British Empire and Commonwealth Games
Place of birth missing (living people)
20th-century Australian people
21st-century Australian people
Medallists at the 1962 British Empire and Commonwealth Games